Werner Rank (born 15 June 1968) is a German former footballer.

References

External links

1968 births
Living people
German footballers
Association football forwards
1. FC Nürnberg II players
Dynamo Dresden players
FC Rot-Weiß Erfurt players
FC Augsburg players
VfR Mannheim players
Bundesliga players
2. Bundesliga players